The 1932 Duquesne Dukes football team was an American football team that represented Duquesne University as an independent during the 1932 college football season. In its sixth season under head coach Elmer Layden, Duquesne compiled a 7–2–1 record and outscored opponents by a total of 132 to 58. The team played its home games at Forbes Field in Pittsburgh.

Schedule

References

Duquesne
Duquesne Dukes football seasons
Duquesne Dukes football